Leo Hayter (born 10 August 2001) is a British racing cyclist, who currently rides for UCI WorldTeam .

Career
As a Junior road cyclist in 2019, he won 1.1 UCI level junior races at the Omloop van Borsele and Trofee van Vlaanderen. In 2021, he won the Liège–Bastogne–Liège Espoirs. In 2022, he won two consecutive stages and the overall title at the Giro Ciclistico d'Italia It was announced on 1 August 2022 he would join  as a Stagiare immediately and then join on a three-year contract from 2023.

Personal
Hayter is the nephew of former New Young Pony Club keyboardist Lou Hayter. His older brother Ethan Hayter is also a racing cyclist who joined  in 2020.

Major results

2018
 2nd Overall Junior Tour of Wales
1st Prologue
2019
 UEC European Junior Track Championships
1st  Team pursuit
3rd  Individual pursuit
 1st National Junior Road Race Series
 1st Trofee van Vlaanderen
 1st EPZ Omloop van Borsele
 2nd E3 BinckBank Classic Junioren
 4th Kuurne–Brussels–Kuurne Juniors
 8th Time trial, UCI Junior Road World Championships
2020
 1st Stage 3 (TTT) Ronde de l'Isard
2021
 National Under-23 Road Championships
1st  Time trial
3rd Road race
 1st Liège–Bastogne–Liège Espoirs
 1st Stage 2 Tour de Bretagne
2022
 1st  Time trial, National Under-23 Road Championships
 1st  Overall Giro Ciclistico d'Italia
1st Stages 2 & 3
 2nd Trofeo Città di Meldola
 3rd  Time trial, UCI Road World Under-23 Championships
 10th Overall Tour du Rwanda

References

External links

2001 births
Living people
British male cyclists
Cyclists from Greater London